Konstantinos Mavropanos (born 11 December 1997) is a Greek professional footballer who plays as a centre-back for Bundesliga club VfB Stuttgart and the Greece national team.

Club career

PAS Giannina
Born in Athens, Mavropanos began his career with the youth side at Apollon Smyrnis, where he stayed for eight years. He then joined Super League side PAS Giannina in January 2016, signing a three-and-a-half-year contract. Mavropanos made his competitive debut for PAS Giannina in the Greek Cup on 29 November 2016. He started and played the full match as PAS Giannina won 1–0.

Mavropanos made his league debut for PAS Giannina on 5 April 2017 against Veria. He started and played 57 minutes as PAS Giannina lost 3–0. He scored his first goal for the club on 19 August 2017 during the first league match of the season against Asteras Tripolis. His 19th-minute goal would be the winner in a 2–1 victory. Mavropanos was then voted man of the match in PAS Giannina's draw against ΑΕΚ Athens a week later on 27 August.

Mavropanos made 23 appearances in all competitions for PAS Giannina, scoring three goals.

Arsenal

On 4 January 2018, Mavropanos signed for Premier League side Arsenal for a reported fee of €2.1 million. On 15 January, Mavropanos helped the Arsenal U-23 team beat Manchester United's reserves 4–0 at home, playing the entire 90 minutes. On 2 February, Mavropanos was added to the Europa League squad for the knockout phase. On 29 April, Mavropanos made his Premier League debut in a 2–1 defeat against Manchester United at Old Trafford. His performance was praised by both fans and pundits. He made his home debut in the club's next match against Burnley. That match was also the final home game under manager Arsène Wenger, with Mavropanos keeping his first clean sheet as the team won 5–0.
He also played in the following game away against Leicester City, but was sent off after 15 minutes to conclude his first season at Arsenal.

At the beginning of October 2018, Mavropanos suffered a groin injury and was ruled out until mid-December. On 15 January 2019, he returned to competitive action after nearly four months, playing 70 minutes of the U23s' 5–1 win over Manchester City. On 3 February 2019, he made his 2018–19 season debut as a substitute for Shkodran Mustafi in a 3–1 away loss against champions Manchester City. On 12 May 2019, on the last matchday of the season, Mavropanos was partnered with Shkodran Mustafi at centre-back, but was replaced by Laurent Koscielny after half an hour due to injury in a 3–1 away win against Burnley.

Loan to 1. FC Nürnberg
On 13 January 2020, after struggling for match time at Arsenal, Mavropanos moved to 2. Bundesliga club 1. FC Nürnberg on loan for the remainder of the 2019–20 season, and the Greek international picked up momentum in the heart of the Nuremberg defence with three stellar performances in a row. He won consecutive Man of the Match awards in his second and third game for the club, before making a key goalline clearance in his fourth. On 25 February 2020, Mavropanos picked up an injury playing against Darmstadt 98; the club was unsure of how long he would be absent.

Loan and permanent move to VfB Stuttgart
On 16 July 2020, Mavropanos signed a new deal with Arsenal and joined VfB Stuttgart on a €250.000 loan for the 2020–21 season. At Stuttgart he was reunited with Sven Mislintat who had originally scouted and signed the player for Arsenal. On 3 October 2020, Mavropanos made his competitive debut for Stuttgart in the Bundesliga against Bayer Leverkusen; the game ended in a 1–1 draw. On 15 October 2020, Mavropanos suffered an injury during a friendly with SC Freiburg and underwent an operation on his meniscus.

On 24 June 2021, his loan deal was extended for a second season, with an option to make the loan permanent with a purchase option of €3.5 million at the end of the season. On 7 August 2021, a week before hosting Greuther Fürth for the Bundesliga premiere, Mavropanos scored a header from a corner kick against BFC Dynamo as he started the first round of the DFB-Pokal.
On 28 August 2021, Mavropanos scored his first Bundesliga goal as he battled his way through three defenders before exchanging passes with Hamadi Al Ghaddioui and sent a fine finish into the top corner in a home Bundesliga game against SC Freiburg. On 2 October 2021, with an hour played, Konstantinos Mavropanos collected the ball on the right, burst through the Hoffenheim defence, and unleashed a fierce left-footed drive to double Stuttgart's advantage in a 3–1 home Bundesliga win. On 16 October 2021, the Greek central defender opened the scoring in the 15th minute with a shot from 30 meters and against the flow of the match, eventually sealing a 1–1 away draw against Borussia Mönchengladbach. On 11 December 2021, he opened the score with a tremendous kick in a vital away 2–0 win against VfL Wolfsburg in the club effort to avoid relegation. This was the fourth goal of the season for the defender.

After the German club avoided relegation in May 2022, a purchase option for Mavropanos with a contract until June 2025 at Stuttgart was triggered.

International career
On 24 March 2021, Mavropanos was called up to the Greek senior team by coach John van 't Schip for the forthcoming World Cup 2022 qualifiers against Spain and Georgia. On 28 March 2021, he made his debut with the national team as a substitute in a friendly against Honduras.

Career statistics

Club

International

References

External links

1997 births
Living people
Footballers from Athens
Greek footballers
Association football defenders
PAS Giannina F.C. players
Arsenal F.C. players
1. FC Nürnberg players
VfB Stuttgart players
Super League Greece players
Premier League players
Bundesliga players
2. Bundesliga players
Greece under-21 international footballers
Greece international footballers
Greek expatriate footballers
Expatriate footballers in England
Expatriate footballers in Germany
Greek expatriate sportspeople in England
Greek expatriate sportspeople in Germany